The Journal of the Acoustical Society of America is a monthly peer-reviewed scientific journal covering all aspects of acoustics. It is published by the Acoustical Society of America and the editor-in-chief is James F. Lynch (Woods Hole Oceanographic Institution).

References

External links

Acoustical Society of America
Acoustics journals
Publications established in 1929
Monthly journals
English-language journals